Marcel Monsberger (born 12 March 2001) is an Austrian professional footballer who plays as a forward for Floridsdorfer AC, on loan from FC Juniors OÖ.

Club career
On 1 July 2021, he joined Floridsdorfer AC on loan.

References

2001 births
Living people
Austrian footballers
Austria youth international footballers
Association football forwards
Wolfsberger AC players
FC Juniors OÖ players
SK Vorwärts Steyr players
Floridsdorfer AC players
Austrian Football Bundesliga players
2. Liga (Austria) players
Austrian Regionalliga players